Antoniotto Botta Adorno, also Anton Otto Marchese Botta d'Adorno (Castelletto di Branduzzo, 1688 - Torre d'Isola, 29 December 1774) was a high officer of the Habsburg monarchy and a plenipotentiary of the Austrian Netherlands.

Biography
He was born in Branduzzo, Lombardy, to a noble family from Genoa whose members included seven doges of that city. His mother had an alleged love affair with King Philip V of Spain. A year after his birth his father, accused of an attempted coup, was expelled from the Republic of Genoa. In 1700 Antoniotto's father died, and, as the family fiefs went to his elder brother Alessandro, he chose a military career.

He distinguished himself during the Siege of Belgrade (1717), where he fought alongside Eugene of Savoy. Promoted subsequently as lieutenant colonel, general and marshal, he received the supreme command of Austrian troops in northern Italy during the War of Austrian Succession. In 1746 he led the Austro-Savoyard right wing in the victorious Battle of Piacenza against the French-Spanish coalition. He succeeded the sick Josef Wenzel, Prince of Liechtenstein as Austrian Supreme Commander in Italy, and fought the retreating Franco-Spanish troops in the Battle of Rottofredo.

On 7 September the same year, after occupying Genoa, he became Austrian governor of the city. He taxed Genoa so hard (Ai Genovesi non lascerò altro che gli occhi per piangere; I will leave the Genoese only their eyes to weep), that he was chased on 5 December by a popular revolt led by Balilla. Having lost the city, he was relieved of all military commands for the rest of the war.

In 1749, a year after the Treaty of Aix-la-Chapelle, he became plenipotentiary of the Austrian Netherlands under Prince Charles Alexander of Lorraine. He reformed the army and tried to improve the conditions of the country.

Four years later, in 1753, he stepped down from his office in the Austrian Netherlands. Count Johann Karl Philipp von Cobenzl (1712–1770) became his successor as minister plenipotentiary in Brussels. Adorno returned to Italy and became prime minister of the Grand Duchy of Tuscany.

In 1762 he was appointed as ambassador at Catherine II of Russia's court. Three years later he became regent of the Grand Duchy of Tuscany after the death of emperor Francis I.

After his assignment in Tuscany, he returned to Pavia, where, thanks to the large patrimony he had accumulated, he had his family's palace in the city (Palazzo Botta Adorno) enlarged and had a villa built in Torre d'Isola in the Pavia countryside. He died at Torre d'Isola, near Pavia, in 1774.

References

Notes

Botta Adorno, Antoniotto
Botta Adorno, Antoniotto
Botta Adorno, Antoniotto
Botta Adorno, Antoniotto
Botta Adorno, Antoniotto
Botta Adorno, Antoniotto
Botta Adorno, Antoniotto
Botta Adorno, Antoniotto
Nobility from Naples
Botta Adorno, Antoniotto
18th-century Italian people
Diplomats of the Habsburg monarchy
18th-century diplomats
Generals of the Holy Roman Empire